This is a list of the Austrian Singles Chart number-one hits of 1999.

See also
1999 in music

References

1999 in Austria
1999 record charts
Lists of number-one songs in Austria